Sidiki is an African name that may refer to
Babou Sidiki Barro (born 1990), Ivorian football player
Mamadou Sidiki Diabaté (born 1982), Mandé kora player and jali from Mali 
Sidiki Bakaba (born 1949), actor and scenario writer from Côte d'Ivoire 
Sidiki Kaba (born 1950), keeper of the seals and the Minister of Justice of Senegal